Mesotherapy (from Greek mesos, "middle", and therapy from Greek therapeia) is a non-invasive non-surgical technique that uses micro-injections of pharmaceutical 
preparations, plant extracts, vitamins, and other ingredients into subcutaneous fat. Mesotherapy injections allegedly target adipose fat cells, apparently by inducing lipolysis, rupture and cell death among adipocytes. The aim of mesotherapy is to provide the skin with essential nutrients, hydration, and other beneficial compounds to rejuvenate and revitalize its appearance. While mesotherapy can help reduce the appearance of fine lines and wrinkles, as well as firm and tone the skin, it's important to note that it's not a permanent solution. The effects of the treatment may vary depending on the individual and may require multiple sessions to achieve the desired results.

Usage
There are published studies on the clinical treatments and effects of these medications and numerous cocktails of combined chemical compounds on the body have been reported in Europe and South America for several years. There is no conclusive research proof that these chemical compounds work to target adipose (fat cells) specifically. Cell lysis, resulting from the detergent action of deoxycholic, may account for any clinical effect.

History
Michel Pistor (1924–2003) performed clinical research and founded the field of mesotherapy.  Multi-national research in intradermal therapy culminated with Pistor's work from 1948 to 1952 in human mesotherapy treatments.  The French press coined the term mesotherapy in 1958.  The French Académie Nationale de Médecine recognized mesotherapy as a specialty of medicine in 1987.  The French Society of Mesotherapy recognizes its use as treatment for various conditions but makes no mention of its use in plastic surgery.   Popular throughout European countries and South America, mesotherapy is practiced by approximately 18,000 physicians worldwide.

Criticism
Physicians have expressed concern over the efficacy of mesotherapy, arguing that the treatment hasn't been studied enough to make a determination. The primary issue is that mesotherapy for the treatment of cosmetic conditions hasn't been the subject of gold standard clinical trials; however the procedure has been studied for the pain relief of other ailments, such as tendonitis, tendon calcification, dental procedures, cancer, cervicobrachialgia, arthritis, lymphedema, and venous stasis. Further, there have been case series and numerous medical papers on the mesotherapy as a cosmetic treatment, as well as studies that employ the ingredients used in mesotherapy.

The other side of the debate is expressed by Rod Rohrich, M.D., Chairman, Dept. of Plastic Surgery, University of Texas Southwestern Medical Center, Dallas: "There is simply no data, no science and no information, to my knowledge, that mesotherapy works." The American Society of Plastic Surgeons issued a position statement not endorsing mesotherapy, but this non-endorsement is the subject of some controversy. Since mesotherapy isn't a surgical treatment but, rather, a non-invasive alternative to plastic surgery, the treatment competes with plastic surgery for the same patients.

The FDA cannot control the use of practitioners injecting various mixtures into patient's bodies because this practice falls under the jurisdiction of state medical boards and mesotherapy is considered a "procedure" by state medical boards. The FDA, on the other hand, is mandated to approve foods, dietary supplements, drugs, vaccines, biological medical products, blood products, medical devices, radiation-emitting devices, veterinary products and cosmetics.

Robin Ashinoff, speaking for the American Academy of Dermatology, says "A simple injection is giving people false hope. Everybody's looking for a quick fix. But there is no quick fix for fat or fat deposits or for cellulite." The American Society for Dermatologic Surgery informed its members in February 2005 that "further study is warranted before this technique can be endorsed."

Many dermatologists and plastic surgeons are alarmed about the growing profile of mesotherapy. "No one says exactly what they put into the (syringe)," says Naomi Lawrence, a derma-surgeon at the University of Medicine and Dentistry of New Jersey. "One drug they often use, phosphatidylcholine, is unpredictable and causes extreme inflammation and swelling where injected. It is not a benign drug."

It is currently banned in a number of South American countries. Even Brazil, which is less strict than the US in drug approvals, has banned the drug for these purposes.

In Australia, an alternative therapy salon is being investigated by the Health Department after several clients developed skin abscesses on the calves, buttocks, thighs, abdomen, shoulders, face and neck from the treatment, with one patient also developing a mycobacterial infection.

Following undesirable effects observed on several patients of a French practitioner, an official ratification was published in France in April 2011 to ban mesotherapy as a method for removing fat deposits.
This ban was canceled in June 2011 by the French Council of State because the investigation proved that these undesirable effects weren't due to  mesotherapy itself, but were due to unhygienic conditions.

Clinical studies
In a prospective study, 10 patients underwent four sessions of facial mesotherapy using multivitamins at monthly intervals. This study found that there was no clinically relevant benefit for skin rejuvenation. Deoxycholic acid received FDA approval as an injectable to dissolve submental fat June 2015 based on the results of a phase III randomized trial of 2600 patients in which 68.2% of patients showed a response by measurement of the fat deposit; 81% had mild adverse reactions of bruising, swelling, pain, numbness, erythema, and firmness around the treated area.

References

External links
American Board of Aesthetic Mesotherapy
French Society of Mesotherapy
Vitamin D3 K2
Professional Board of Mesotherapy Atlanta
Mesotherapy For Hair Loss

Cosmetics
Alternative medical treatments
Pseudoscience
1950s neologisms
French inventions